The 2022–23 Buffalo Beauts season is the eighth in franchise history. In the off-season, the club signed former league MVP Mikyla Grant-Mentis to the largest single-season contract in league history, valued at $80,000 USD. Defenseman Dominique Kremer signed the league's first-ever 2-year contract on the opening day of free agency and was named team Captain on September 22. This will mark her first season in the role.

Offseason
October 26: Cassidy MacPherson and Claudia Kepler were named alternate captains for the Beauts.
November 5: In the season opener, the Beauts hosted the expansion Montreal Force in their PHF regular season debut. Antonia Matzka scored the first goal of the game, also the first of her career.

Schedule and results

Preseason

|- style="background:#fcc;"
| 1 || October 14 || @ Metropolitan Riveters ||  1-5 ||  || Sauvé  || The Rink at American Dream  || 0-1-0 || 0  || Beauts lone goal scored by Jenna Suokko
|- style="background:#fcc;"
| 2 || October 15 || @ Metropolitan Riveters || 0-2  ||   || Sauvé  || The Rink at American Dream  || 0-2-0 || 0  || Kassidy Sauve named Third Star of the Game
|- style="background:#;"
|-

Regular season

Standings

Schedule

|- style="background:#fff;"
| 1 || November 5 || vs. Montreal Force || 4–5 || SO || Berndtsson || Northtown Center || 0–0–1 || 1 || 
|- style="background:#cfc;"
| 2 || November 6 || vs. Montreal Force || 3–2 || || Hofmann || Northtown Center || 1–0–1 || 4 || 
|- style="background:#;"
| – || November 19 || @ Connecticut Whale || || || || || || || Postponed due to inclement weather; rescheduled for January 17
|- style="background:#;"
| – || November 20 || @ Connecticut Whale || || || || || || || Postponed due to inclement weather; rescheduled for January 18

|- style="background:#fcc;"
| 3 || December 10 || vs. Boston Pride || 0–3 || || Sauvé || Northtown Center || 1–1–1 || 4 || 
|- style="background:#fcc;"
| 4 || December 11 || vs. Boston Pride || 5–7 || || Sauvé || Northtown Center || 1–2–1 || 4 || 
|- style="background:#fcc;"
| 5 || December 16 || vs. Toronto Six || 1–2 || || Sauvé || Northtown Center || 1–3–1 || 4 || 
|- style="background:#fcc;"
| 6 || December 17 || vs. Toronto Six || 4–6 || || Berndtsson || Northtown Center || 1–4–1 || 4 || 

|- style="background:#fcc;"
| 7 || January 7 || vs. Minnesota Whitecaps || 1–4 || || Berndtsson || Northtown Center || 1–5–1 || 4 || 
|- style="background:#fcc;"
| 8 || January 8 || vs. Minnesota Whitecaps || 3–5 || || Hofmann || Northtown Center || 1–6–1 || 4 || 
|- style="background:#fcc;"
| 9 || January 14 || @ Boston Pride || 0–8 || || Berndtsson || Warrior Ice Arena || 1–7–1 || 4 || 
|- style="background:#fff;"
| 10 || January 15 || @ Boston Pride || 1–2 || OT || Berndtsson || Warrior Ice Arena || 1–7–2 || 5 || 
|- style="background:#fcc;"
| 11 || January 17 || @ Connecticut Whale || 0–3 || || Berndtsson || Milford Ice Pavilion || 1–8–2 || 5 || Rescheduled from November 19
|- style="background:#fcc;"
| 12 || January 18 || @ Connecticut Whale || 3–7 || || Hofmann || International Skating Center of Connecticut || 1–9–2 || 5 || Rescheduled from November 20
|- style="background:#cfc;"
| 13 || January 21 || vs. Metropolitan Riveters || 4–1 || || Berndtsson || Northtown Center || 2–9–2 || 8 || 
|- style="background:#fcc;"
| 14 || January 22 || vs. Metropolitan Riveters || 2–8 || || Hofmann || Northtown Center || 2–10–2 || 8 || 

|- style="background:#fcc;"
| 15 || February 4 || @ Toronto Six || 0–3 || || Berndtsson || Canlan Ice Sports – York || 2–11–2 || 8 || 
|- style="background:#fcc;"
| 16 || February 5 || @ Toronto Six || 2–7 || || Berndtsson || Canlan Ice Sports - York || 2–12–2 || 8 || 
|- style="background:#cfc;"
| 17 || February 18 || @ Minnesota Whitecaps || 4–2 || || Berndtsson || Richfield Ice Arena || 3–12–2 || 11 || 
|- style="background:#cfc;"
| 18 || February 19 || @ Minnesota Whitecaps || 1–0 || || Ridgewell || Richfield Ice Arena || 4–12–2 || 14 || 
|- style="background:#;"
| 19 || February 25 || @ Montreal Force || || || || Pavillon de la jeunesse || || || 
|- style="background:#;"
| 20 || February 26 || @ Montreal Force || || || || Pavillon de la jeunesse || || || 

|- style="background:#;"
| 21 || March 4 || vs. Connecticut Whale || || || || Northtown Center || || || 
|- style="background:#;"
| 22 || March 5 || vs. Connecticut Whale || || || || Northtown Center || || || 
|- style="background:#;"
| 23 || March 10 || @ Metropolitan Riveters || || || || The Rink at American Dream || || || 
|- style="background:#;"
| 24 || March 11 || @ Metropolitan Riveters || || || || The Rink at American Dream || || || 

|- style="text-align:center;"
| 

|}

Statistics

Skaters

Roster

2022–23 roster 

Coaching staff and team personnel
 Head coach: Rhea Coad
 Assistant coach: Julia DiTondo
 Assistant coach: Jeff State
 Skills coach: Mark Zarbo
 Goaltending coach: Shane Madolora
 Video & analytics: Chris Baudo

Awards and honors

Transactions

Signings

References

Recaps

Buffalo Beauts
Buffalo Beauts
Buffalo Beauts
2022–23 PHF season
2022–23 PHF season by team